Mary Weir may refer to:

 Molly Weir (Mary Weir, 1910–2004), Scottish actress
 Mary Hayward Weir (1915–1968), American steel heiress and socialite
 Mary Jo Deschanel (Mary Jo Weir, born 1945), American actress